Novokizhinginsk (Shene Khejenge) is a rural locality (a selo) in Kizhinginsky District, Republic of Buryatia, Russia. The population was 1,806 as of 2010. There are 29 streets.

Geography 
Novokizhinginsk is located 36 km southwest of Kizhinga (the district's administrative centre) by road. Edermeg is the nearest rural locality.

References 

Rural localities in Kizhinginsky District